Kovilthottam Lighthouse is situated at Kovilthottam in Kollam district of Kerala. The 18-meter tall lighthouse tower is painted with black and white alternating bands. The lighthouse has been provided to serve the Port of Neendakara situated at the entrance to Ashtamudi Backwaters.

Location 
Kovilthottam Lighthouse is situated at Kollam Metropolitan Area. It is about 20 km away from Kollam city centre.
 Chavara – 2.6 km
 Neendakara – 8.6 km
Karunagappally - 10 km
 Tangasseri Lighthouse – 15.2 km
 Kollam – 20 km
 Paravur – 40.7 km

History 
Before the construction of Kovilthottam, there was a flag mast at this location. Later, a wooden tower was constructed here. A blinking DA gas light was installed on 14 February 1953. This temporary arrangement was replaced later in 1960–1961 after the completion of the masonry tower. The emergency source was replaced by 12V 100W Halogen lamp in a 200 mm optic outside the lantern on 14 February 1999.

See also 

 List of lighthouses in India

References

External links 
 
 
 

Lighthouses in Kerala
Lighthouses completed in 1953
1953 establishments in Travancore–Cochin
Buildings and structures in Kollam
Lighthouses completed in 1961